The petaltails of the family Petaluridae are apparently the most ancient of the extant true dragonflies (infraorder Anisoptera), having fossil members from as early as the Jurassic (over 150 million years ago).

Modern petalurids include only 11 species, one of which, the Australian Petalura ingentissima, is the largest of living dragonflies, having a wingspan of up to 160 mm and a body length of over 100 mm. Other Australian species include Petalura gigantea (commonly known as the giant dragonfly). In the United States, two species are found, one on either coast. The larvae live primarily in stream banks, mostly in burrows, but the larvae of the eastern US species, Tachopteryx thoreyi, the gray petaltail, live in depressions under wet leaves. The semiaquatic habitat of the larvae makes the petaltails unique in the modern dragonfly families.

Notes

References
Silsby, Jill. 2001. Dragonflies of the World. Smithsonian Institution Press, Washington D.C.

 
Aeshnoidea
Odonata families
Odonata of North America
Odonata of Australia
Taxa named by James George Needham
Insects described in 1903